Kayla Janine Alexander (born January 5, 1991) is a Canadian professional basketball player for the Tango Bourges Basket of the Ligue Féminine de Basketball. She played college basketball for the Syracuse Orange. After a successful career with the Orange, Alexander was drafted with the eighth overall pick in the 2013 WNBA Draft by the San Antonio Stars. She played on the Canada women's national basketball team for Team Canada at the 2020 Olympics in Tokyo.

College career
When Alexander left Syracuse University she was the team's all-time leader in points (2,024), blocks (350), field goals (736), free throws made (552), free throws attempted (750) and games played (140). She became the second player from Syracuse to be selected in a WNBA Draft.

Syracuse statistics

Source

Professional career

WNBA
Alexander was drafted with the eighth pick in the 2013 WNBA Draft by the San Antonio Stars. Since her rookie season, she's been a reserve center on the Stars' roster and a key contributor in rebounding. In the 2016 season, she averaged career-highs in scoring and rebounding with 8.0 points per game and 4.5 rebounds per game. In 2017, Alexander re-signed with the Stars in free agency.

On February 1, 2018, Alexander was traded by the re-branded Las Vegas Aces along with a third-round pick in the 2019 WNBA Draft to the Indiana Fever in exchange for their second-round selection in the 2019 WNBA Draft.

WNBA career statistics

Regular season

|-
| align="left" | 2013
| align="left" | San Antonio
| 33 || 1 || 11.2 || .417 || .000 || .733 || 3.0 || 0.3 || 0.1 || 0.4 || 1.1 || 2.8
|-
| align="left" | 2014
| align="left" | San Antonio
| 33 || 0 || 9.0 || .434 || .000 || .839 || 2.0 || 0.2 || 0.1 || 0.3 || 0.7 || 2.8
|-
| align="left" | 2015
| align="left" | San Antonio
| 29 || 0 || 12.3 || .416 || .000 || .647 || 3.3 || 0.2 || 0.2 || 0.8 || 0.8 || 3.3
|-
| align="left" | 2016
| align="left" | San Antonio
| 25 || 0 || 19.6 || .546 || .000 || .754 || 4.5 || 0.5 || 0.4 || 0.5 || 1.1 || 8.0
|-
| align="left" | 2017
| align="left" | San Antonio
| 34 || 10 || 15.4 || .582 || .000 || .909 || 3.1 || 0.5 || 0.4 || 0.5 || 0.9 || 6.2
|-
| align="left" | 2018
| align="left" | Indiana
| 30 || 0 || 8.6 || .541 || .000 || .824 || 2.2 || 0.2 || 0.1 || 0.3 || 0.6 || 2.7
|-
| align="left" | 2019
| align="left" | Chicago
| 3 || 0 || 6.7 || .750 || .000 || .750 || 2.3 || 0.3 || 0.0 || 0.0 || 0.3 || 3.0 
|-
| align="left" | 2020
| align="left" | Minnesota
| 16 || 0 || 5.6 || .533 || .000 || .625 || 0.9 || 0.2 || 0.1 || 0.2 || 0.4 || 2.3
|-
| align="left" | Career
| align="left" | 8 years, 4 teams
| 203 || 11 || 11.8 || .508 || .000 || .763 || 2.8 || 0.3 || 0.2 || 0.4 || 0.8 || 4.0

Playoffs

|-
| align="left" | 2014
| align="left" | San Antonio
| 1 || 0 || 1.0 || .000 || .000 || .000 || 0.0 || 0.0 || 0.0 || 0.0 || 0.0 || 0.0
|-
| align="left" | 2019
| align="left" | Chicago
| 2 || 0 || 1.5 || 1.000 || .000 || .000 || 1.0 || 0.0 || 0.0 || 0.0 || 0.0 || 2.0
|-
| align="left" | Career
| align="left" | 2 years, 2 teams
| 3 || 0 || 1.9 || 1.000 || .000 || .000 || 0.7 || 0.0 || 0.0 || 0.0 || 0.0 || 1.3

Overseas career 
In the 2015-16 WNBA off-season, Alexander played in Russia for WBC Sparta&K. In August 2016, Alexander signed a short-term deal with CJM Bourges Basket of the Ligue Féminine de Basketball for the 2016-17 WNBA off-season.

In early 2020, she signed with Arka Gdynia of the Basket Liga Kobiet FIBA Polish league, but returned to Canada that March due to the cancellation of the season at the onset of the COVID-19 pandemic.

Personal life 
Alexander said she wanted to become a teacher once she retires from basketball. Her brother, Kyle played for the Miami Heat.

In 2019, Alexander wrote and illustrated a children's book, The Magic of Basketball. Her sister, Kesia, is credited as co-author.

References

1991 births
Living people
Basketball people from Ontario
Basketball players at the 2020 Summer Olympics
Black Canadian basketball players
Canadian expatriate basketball people in the United States
Canadian women's basketball players
Centers (basketball)
Chicago Sky players
Indiana Fever players
Minnesota Lynx players
Olympic basketball players of Canada
San Antonio Silver Stars draft picks
San Antonio Stars players
Sportspeople from Milton, Ontario
Syracuse Orange women's basketball players